Samuel D. Phillips (1845 – 1915) was a Medal of Honor recipient in the United States Army during the Plains Indian Wars. While serving as a private in Company H, 2nd U.S. Cavalry, he fought in an action against Indians at the Battle of Little Muddy Creek in Montana Territory on May 7, 1877.

Medal of Honor citation
Rank and organization: Private, Company H, 2d U.S. Cavalry. Place and date: At Muddy Creek, Mont., May 7, 1877. Entered service at: United States. Birth: Butler County, Ohio, United States. Date of issue: August 8, 1877. 

Citation:

Gallantry in action.

See also

List of Medal of Honor recipients

References

External links

1845 births
1915 deaths
American people of the Indian Wars
United States Army Medal of Honor recipients
United States Army soldiers
People from Butler County, Ohio
American Indian Wars recipients of the Medal of Honor